JVC (short for Japan Victor Company) is a Japanese brand owned by JVCKenwood corporation.

From 1953 to 2008, the Matsushita Electric Industrial Co. was the majority stockholder in JVC. In 2008, JVC merged with Kenwood Corporation to create JVCKenwood. JVC sold their electronic products in their home market of Japan under the "Victor" name with the His Master's Voice logo but used the name JVC or Nivico in the past for export due to differing ownership of the His Master's Voice logo and the ownership of the "Victor" name from successors of the Victor Talking Machine Company. In 2011, the Victor brand for electronics in Japan was replaced by the global JVC brand. However, the previous "Victor" name and logo are retained by JVCKenwood Victor Entertainment, and are used as JVCKenwood's luxury HiFi marque.

History

1927 creation to World War II
JVC was founded in 1927 as the Victor Talking Machine Company of Japan, Limited, a subsidiary of the United States' leading phonograph and record company, the Victor Talking Machine Company of Camden, New Jersey. In 1929, the Radio Corporation of America purchased Victor and its foreign subsidiaries, including the Japan operations. In the late 1920s, JVC produced only phonographs and records; following the acquisition by RCA, JVC began producing radios, and in 1939, Japan's first locally-made television. In 1943, amidst the hostilities between the United States and Japan during World War II, JVC seceded from RCA Victor, retaining the 'Victor' and "His Master's Voice" trademarks for use in Japan only. After the war, JVC resumed distribution of RCA Victor recordings in Japan until RCA established its own separate distribution in Japan during the late 1960s. Today, the record company in Japan is known as Victor Entertainment.

Post-war

In 1953, JVC became majority-owned by the Panasonic Corporation. Panasonic released its ownership in 2007.

In the 1960s, JVC established the Nivico (Nippon Victor Corporation) brand for Delmonico's line of console televisions and stereos.

In 1970, JVC marketed the Videosphere, a portable cathode ray tube (CRT) television inside a space-helmet-shaped casing with an alarm clock at the base. It was a commercial success.

In 1971, JVC introduced the first discrete system for four channel quadraphonic sound on vinyl records - CD-4 (Compatible Discrete Four Channel) or Quadradisc, as it was called by the Radio Corporation of America (RCA) in the United States.

In 1973, the JVC Cutting Center opened (in the USA) to provide mastering for CD-4 discs. The Mark II 1/2 speed system was used until mid-1975 when it was replaced with the Mark III 1/2 speed system. In 1978, Mobile Fidelity began using the JVC Cutting Center to 1/2 speed master Stereo/Mono discs.

In 1975, JVC introduced the first combined portable battery-operated radio with inbuilt TV, as the model 3050. The TV was a  black-and-white cathode ray tube. One year later, JVC expanded the model to add a cassette-recorder, as the 3060, creating the world's first boombox with radio, cassette and TV.

In 1976, the first VCR to use VHS was the Victor HR-3300, and was introduced by the president of JVC at the Okura Hotel in Tokyo on September 9, 1976. JVC started selling the HR-3300 in Akihabara, Tokyo, Japan on October 31, 1976. Region-specific versions of the JVC HR-3300 were also distributed later on, such as the HR-3300U in the United States, and HR-3300EK in the United Kingdom.

1970s, 1980s and the VHS/Betamax format war

In the late 1970s, JVC developed the VHS format, introducing the first VHS recorders to the consumer market in 1976 for the equivalent of US$1,060. Sony, which had introduced the Betamax home videocassette tape a year earlier, became the main competitor for JVC's VHS format into the 1980s, creating the videotape format war. The Betamax cassette was smaller, with slightly superior picture quality to the VHS cassette, but this resulted in Betamax having less recording time. The two companies competed fiercely to encourage others to adopt their format, but by 1984 forty companies were using JVC's VHS format, while only 12 used Betamax. Sony began producing VHS recorders in 1988 and after 1993 stopped making Betamax recorders for the US market, and then completely in 2002. One reason for the market penetration of VHS in the UK were the sales of blank tapes by JVC UK Ltd to major Hollywood studios. This launched the nascent home video rental market, which was hardly touched by Sony at the time. This ability to take movies home helped the sale of the VHS hardware immensely. Added to this JVC stated in a promotional tape presented by BBC TV legend Cliff Michelmore, that "You'll be able to buy the sort of films the BBC and ITV will never show you, for whatever reason". This accompanied by a clip from a slightly risqué adult movie. The adult movie industry adopted VHS as their common format and with that level of software available, hardware sales grew.

Other notable achievements
In 1979, JVC demonstrated a prototype of its video high density (VHD) disc system. This system was capacitance-based, like capacitance electronic disc (CED), but the discs were grooveless with the stylus being guided by servo signals in the disc surface. The VHD discs were initially handled by the operator and played on a machine that looked like an audio LP turntable, but JVC used caddy-housed discs when the system was marketed. Development suffered numerous delays, and the product was launched in 1983 in Japan, followed by the United Kingdom in 1984, to a limited industrial market.

In 1981, JVC introduced a line of revolutionary direct-drive cassette decks, topped by the DD-9, that provided previously unattainable levels of speed stability.

During the 1980s JVC briefly marketed its own portable audio equipment similar to the Sony Walkman on the market at the time. The JVC CQ-F2K was released in 1982 and had a detachable radio that mounted to the headphones for a compact, wire-free listening experience. JVC had difficulty making the products successful, and a few years later stopped making them. In Japan, JVC marketed the products under the name "Victor".

In 1986, JVC released the HC-95, a personal computer with a 3.58 MHz Zilog Z80A processor, 64 KB RAM, running on MSX Basic 2.0. It included two 3.5" floppy disk drives and conformed to the graphics specification of the MSX-2 standard. However, like the Pioneer PX-7, it also carried a sophisticated hardware interface that handled video superimposition and various interactive video processing features. The JVC HC-95 was first sold in Japan, and then Europe, but sales were disappointing.

JVC video recorders were marketed by the Ferguson Radio Corporation in the UK, with just cosmetic changes. However, Ferguson needed to find another supplier for its camcorders when JVC produced only the VHS-C format, rather than video8. Ferguson was later acquired by Thomson SA, which ended the relationship. JVC later invented hard drive camcorders.

21st century

In October 2001, the National Academy of Television Arts and Sciences presented JVC an Emmy Award for "outstanding achievement in technological advancement" for "Pioneering Development of Consumer Camcorders". Annual sponsorships of the world-renowned JVC Tokyo Video Festival and the JVC Jazz Festival have helped attract the attention of more customers.

JVC has been a worldwide football (soccer) supporter since 1982, having a former kit sponsorship with Arsenal and continued its role as an official partner of 2002 FIFA World Cup Korea/Japan. JVC made headlines as the first-ever corporate partner of the Kennedy Space Center Visitor Complex. JVC has recently forged corporate partnerships with ESPN Zone and Foxploration. In 2005, JVC joined HANA, the High-Definition Audio-Video Network Alliance, to help establish standards in consumer-electronics interoperability.

In 2005, JVC announced their development of the first DVD-RW DL media (the dual layer version of the rewritable DVD-RW format).

In December 2006, Matsushita entered talks with Kenwood and Cerberus Capital Management to sell its stake in JVC. 
In 2007, Victor Company of Japan Ltd confirmed a strategic capital alliance with Kenwood and SPARKX Investment, resulting in Matsushita's holding being reduced to approximately 37%.
In March 2008, Matsushita (Panasonic) agreed to spin off the company and merge it with Kenwood Electronics, creating JVCKenwood Holdings on October 1, 2008.

In April 2008, JVC announced that it was closing its TV plants in East Kilbride (Scotland) and Japan. This left it with one plant in Thailand. It stated it would outsource European production to an OEM.

JVC TVs for North America are now being manufactured by AmTRAN Video Corporation along with distribution, service, and warranty under license from JVCKenwood. In Europe, Currys plc, owner of Currys, has a similar arrangement with JVCKenwood.

In Europe, JVC sells mainly some audio accessories, like headphones, and until recently DIN type car audio. Also in Europe, JVC is present with camcorders, security cameras, audio systems and with their emblematic boom box, projectors. JVC TV sets in Europe are manufactured mainly by Turkish manufacturer Vestel, but are not available in all countries.

JVC Indonesia manufactures and supplies original audio equipment for Datsun, Nissan, Suzuki, and Honda automobiles.

Sponsorship
JVC is a well-known brand among English football fans due to the firm's sponsorship of Arsenal from 1981 to 1999, when Sega took over as Arsenal's sponsors. JVC's 18-year association with Arsenal is one of the longest club-sponsor associations with any professional club football. JVC also sponsored Scottish football club Aberdeen in the late-1980s and early-1990s as well as the FIFA World Cup from 1982 to 2002.

JVC also sponsors the "away" shirts of the Australian A-League club, Sydney FC, and Dutch race driver Christijan Albers.

JVC has also been a sponsor of a massively multiplayer online game called Rise: The Vieneo Province since 2003.

Brand name

JVC is generally known within Japan by the Victor brand, preceded by the His Master's Voice (HMV) logo featuring the dog Nipper. Because of a conflict in trademarks between HMV, RCA and Victor, HMV and RCA are not allowed to use Nipper in Japan. At one time, the company used the Nivico name (for "Nippon Victor Company") overseas, before rebranding to JVC, which stands for Japan's Victor Company. Therefore, the Victor and JVC-Victor web sites looked quite different. Conversely, the HMV store chain exists in Japan (though no longer owned by HMV Group), but it cannot use the His Master's Voice motto or logo; its logo is a stylized image of a gramophone only. After the Radio Corporation of America (RCA), purchased the Victor Talking Machine Company in 1929 and became RCA Victor in Japan, RCA also had acquired the use of Nipper and His Master's Voice logo, but for use in the Western Hemisphere. In 2011, JVC decided to phase out the "Victor" brand for electronics in Japan, but retained its use for its premium audio products, recording studios Victor Studio, and record label JVCKenwood Victor Entertainment.

Subsidiaries
 JVC KENWOOD Marketing India Gurgaon, Haryana, India
 JVC America Inc. – Tuscaloosa, Alabama, US
 JVC Americas Corp – Wayne, New Jersey, US
 JVC Canada Inc. – Mississauga, Ontario, Canada
 JVC Asia – Singapore
 JVC Australia – Australia
 JVC China – China
 JVC Europe – United Kingdom
 JVC Middle-East (and Africa) – Dubai, UAE
 JVC Latin America, S.A. – Panama
 JVC do Brasil Ltda. – Brazil
 JVC International – Austria
 Victor Entertainment

Product gallery

See also

 List of digital camera brands
 List of home computers
 Mitsubishi Electric
 Taiyo Yuden (partner with JVC)
 Video
 D-VHS
 W-VHS
 Videotape
 Video tape recorder
 Videocassette recorder
 Wondermega
 XRCD

Notes

References

External links

 

Audio equipment manufacturers of Japan
Electronics companies established in 1927
Electronics companies disestablished in 2011
Companies formerly listed on the Tokyo Stock Exchange
Consumer electronics brands
Display technology companies
Electronics companies of Japan
Headphones manufacturers
Japanese brands
Japanese companies established in 1927
Japanese companies disestablished in 2011
JVCKenwood
2011 mergers and acquisitions
Loudspeaker manufacturers
Microphone manufacturers
Movie camera manufacturers
Portable audio player manufacturers
VHS
Radio manufacturers